Airline reservation systems (ARS) are systems that allow an airline to sell their inventory (seats). It contains information on schedules and fares and contains a database of reservations (or passenger name records) and of tickets issued (if applicable). ARSs are part of passenger service systems (PSS), which are applications supporting the direct contact with the passenger.

ARS eventually evolved into the computer reservations system (CRS). A computer reservation system is used for the reservations of a particular airline and interfaces with a global distribution system (GDS) which supports travel agencies and other distribution channels in making reservations for most major airlines in a single system.

Overview 
Airline reservation systems incorporate airline schedules, fare tariffs, passenger reservations and ticket records. An airline's direct distribution works within their own reservation system, as well as pushing out information to the GDS. The second type of direct distribution channel are consumers who use the internet or mobile applications to make their own reservations. Travel agencies and other indirect distribution channels access the same GDS as those accessed by the airline reservation systems, and all messaging is transmitted by a standardized messaging system that functions on two types of messaging that transmit on SITA's high level network (HLN). These messaging types are called Type A [usually EDIFACT format] for real time interactive communication and Type B [TTY] for informational and booking type of messages. Message construction standards set by IATA and ICAO, are global, and apply to more than air transportation. Since airline reservation systems are business critical applications, and they are functionally quite complex, the operation of an in-house airline reservation system is relatively expensive.

Prior to deregulation, airlines owned their own reservation systems with travel agents subscribing to them. Today, the GDS are run by independent companies with airlines and travel agencies being major subscribers.

As of February 2009, there are only four major GDS providers in the market: Amadeus, Travelport (which operates the Apollo, Worldspan and Galileo systems), Sabre and Shares. There is one major Regional GDS, Abacus, serving the Asian market and a number of regional players serving single countries, including Travelsky (China), Infini and Axess (both Japan) and Topas (South Korea).  Of these, Infini is hosted within the Sabre complex, Axess is in the process of moving into a partition within the Worldspan complex, and Topas agencies will be migrating into Amadeus.

Reservation systems may host "ticket-less" airlines and "hybrid" airlines that use e-ticketing in addition to ticket-less to accommodate code-shares and interlines.

In addition to these "standardized" GDS, some airlines have proprietary versions which they use to run their flight operations. A few examples are Delta's OSS and Deltamatic systems and EDS SHARES.  SITA Reservations remains the largest neutral multi-host airline reservations system, with over 100 airlines currently managing inventory.

Inventory management 
In the airline industry, available seats are commonly referred to as inventory. The inventory of an airline is generally classified into service classes (e.g. economy,  premium economy, business or first class) and any number of fare classes, to which different prices and booking conditions may apply. Fare classes are complicated and vary from airline to airline, often indicated by a one letter code. The meaning of these codes are not often known by the passenger, but conveys information to airline staff, for example they may indicate that a ticket was fully paid, or discounted or purchased through a loyalty scheme, etc. Some seats may not be available for open sale, but reserved for example for connecting flight or loyalty scheme passengers. Overbooking is also a common practice, and is an exception to inventory management principles. One of the core functions of inventory management is inventory control. Inventory control monitors how many seats are available in the different fare classes, and by opening and closing individual fare classes for sale.

A flight schedule management system forms the foundation of the inventory management system. Besides other functions, it is critical for ticket sales, crew member assignments, aircraft maintenance, airport coordination, and connections to partner airlines. The schedule system monitors what and when aircraft will be available on particular routes, and their internal configuration. Inventory data is imported and maintained from the schedule distribution system. Changes to aircraft availability would immediately impact the available seats of the fleet, as well as the seats which had been sold.

The price for each sold seat is determined by a combination of the fares and booking conditions stored in the Fare Quote System,. In most cases, inventory control has a real time interface to an airline’s yield management system to support a permanent optimization of the offered booking classes in response to changes in demand or pricing strategies of competitors.

Availability display and reservation (PNR) 
Users access an airline’s inventory through an availability display. It contains all offered flights for a particular city-pair with their available seats in the different booking classes. This display contains flights which are operated by the airline itself as well as code share flights which are operated in co-operation with another airline. If the city pair is not one on which the airline offers service, it may display a connection using its own flights or display the flights of other airlines. The availability of seats of other airlines is updated through standard industry interfaces. Depending on the type of co-operation, it supports access to the last seat (last seat availability) in real-time. Reservations for individual passengers or groups are stored in a so-called passenger name record (PNR). Among other data, the PNR contains personal information such as name, contact information or special services requests (SSRs) e.g. for a vegetarian meal, as well as the flights (segments) and issued tickets. Some reservation systems also allow to store customer data in profiles to avoid data re-entry each time a new reservation is made for a known passenger. In addition, most systems have interfaces to CRM systems or customer loyalty applications (aka frequent traveler systems). Before a flight departs, the so-called passenger name list (PNL) is handed over to the departure control system that is used to check-in passengers and baggage. Reservation data such as the number of booked passengers and special service requests is also transferred to flight operations systems, crew management and catering systems. Once a flight has departed, the reservation system is updated with a list of the checked-in passengers (e.g. passengers who had a reservation but did not check in (no shows) and passengers who checked in, but did not have a reservation (go shows)). Finally, data needed for revenue accounting and reporting is handed over to administrative systems.

Fare quote and ticketing 

The Fares data store contains fare tariffs, rule sets, routing maps, class of service tables, and some tax information that construct the price – "the fare". Rules like booking conditions (e.g. minimum stay, advance purchase, etc.) are tailored differently between different city pairs or zones, and assigned a class of service corresponding to its appropriate inventory bucket. Inventory control can also be manipulated manually through the availability feeds, dynamically controlling how many seats are offered for a particular price by opening and closing particular classes.

The compiled set of fare conditions is called a fare basis code. There are two systems set up for the interchange of fares data — ATPCO and SITA, plus some system to system direct connects. This system distributes the fare tariffs and rule sets to all GDSs and other subscribers. Every airline employs staff who code air fare rules in accordance with yield management intent. There are also revenue managers who watch fares as they are filed into the public tariffs and make competitive recommendations. Inventory control is typically manipulated from here, using availability feeds to open and close classes of service.

The role of the ticketing complex is to issue and store electronic ticket records and the very small number of paper tickets that are still issued. Miscellaneous charges order (MCO) is still a paper document; IATA has working groups defining the replacement document the electronic multipurpose document (EMD) as at 2010. The electronic ticket information is stored in a database containing the data that historically was printed on a paper ticket including items such as the ticket number, the fare and tax components of the ticket price or exchange rate information. In the past, airlines issued paper tickets; since 2008, IATA has been supporting a resolution to move to 100% electronic ticketing. So far, the industry has not been able to comply due to various technological and international limitations. The industry is at 98% electronic ticket issuance today, although electronic processing for MCOs was not available in time for the IATA mandate.

Notable systems

History 

Until the 1950s, airline reservations used manual systems at centralized reservation centers, which consisted of groups of people in a room with physical cards that represented inventory, in this case, seats on airplanes. In the late 1950s, American Airlines wanted a system that would allow real-time access to flight details in all of its offices, and the integration and automation of its booking and ticketing processes. It introduced an electronic reservations system, Magnetronic Reservisor, in 1952. In 1964, it developed the Sabre (Semi-Automated Business Research Environment). Sabre's breakthrough was its ability to keep inventory correct in real time, accessible to agents around the world.

The deregulation of the airline industry, in the Airline Deregulation Act, meant that airlines, which had previously operated under government-set fares ensuring airlines at least broke even, now needed to improve efficiency to compete in a free market.  In this deregulated environment, the ARS and its descendants became vital to the travel industry.

See also 

 USAS (application)
 List of global distribution systems

Further reading 
 Winston, Clifford, "The Evolution of the Airline Industry", Brookings Institution Press, 1995. . Cf. p. 61–62, Computer Reservation Systems.
 Wardell, David J, "Airline Reservation Systems", 1991. Research paper.

References
Airline reservation system: All you need to know

Reservation System, Airline
Travel technology